Members of the New South Wales Legislative Assembly who served in the 10th parliament of New South Wales held their seats from 1880 to 1882.
Elections for the tenth Legislative Assembly were held between 17 November and 10 December 1880 with parliament first meeting on 15 December 1880.  Electoral reforms passed by the ninth parliament had resulted in parliament being expanded to 108 members elected in 43 single member electorates, 25 two member electorates, 1 three member electorate and 3 four member electorates. In addition, electorates franchised on qualifications of occupation or education (Goldfields North, Goldfields South, Goldfields West and University of Sydney) had been abolished. The parliament had a maximum term of 3 years but was dissolved after 23 months. Sir Henry Parkes continued as the Premier for the duration of the parliament. The Speaker was Sir George Allen.

See also
Third Parkes ministry
Results of the 1880 New South Wales colonial election
Candidates of the 1880 New South Wales colonial election

Notes
There was no party system in New South Wales politics until 1887. Under the constitution, ministers were required to resign to recontest their seats in a by-election when appointed. These by-elections are only noted when the minister was defeated; in general, he was elected unopposed.

References

 

Members of New South Wales parliaments by term
19th-century Australian politicians